Robert Lindstedt and Horia Tecău were the defending champions, but Lindstedt chose not to participate. 
Tecău partnered with Lukáš Dlouhý, but were eliminated in the quarterfinals by Santiago González and Jamie Murray.
Jonathan Erlich and Andy Ram won the title, defeating Christopher Kas and Alexander Peya 7–6(7–2), 6–4 in the final.

Seeds

Draw

Draw

References
 Main Draw

Winston-Salem Open - Doubles
2011 Doubles